John Smith Chartres (5 October 1862 – 14 May 1927) was an Irish civil servant and revolutionary.

References

1862 births
1927 deaths
Irish Republican Army (1919–1922) members
Civil servants from Dublin (city)
People of the Irish Civil War (Pro-Treaty side)